Bellator 282: Mousasi vs. Eblen was a mixed martial arts event produced by Bellator MMA that took place on June 24, 2022 at Mohegan Sun Arena in Uncasville, Connecticut, United States.

Background 
Gegard Mousasi defended his Middleweight title against Johnny Eblen for the event. The bout served as the main event.

In addition to the middleweight main event, two quarterfinal bouts in the Bellator Bantamweight World Grand Prix were featured at the event. The first bout saw #4 ranked Magomed Magomedov facing Enrique Barzola. The second bout saw #6 ranked Leandro Higo opposite Danny Sabatello.

Results

See also 

 2022 in Bellator MMA
 List of Bellator MMA events
 List of current Bellator fighters
 Bellator MMA Rankings

References 

Bellator MMA events
Events in Uncasville, Connecticut
2022 in mixed martial arts
June 2022 sports events in the United States
2022 in sports in Connecticut
Mixed martial arts in Connecticut
Sports competitions in Connecticut